Jeff Jackson (born March 14, 1974) is a hurdler who represents the United States Virgin Islands. He competed in the men's 110 metres hurdles at the 2000 Summer Olympics.

References

1974 births
Living people
Athletes (track and field) at the 2000 Summer Olympics
United States Virgin Islands male hurdlers
Olympic track and field athletes of the United States Virgin Islands
Place of birth missing (living people)